This is a list of the transfers for the 2012–13 I-League season.

Transfers

All clubs without a flag are Indian.

References

India
Lists of I-League transfers